Dirección General @prende.mx, formerly known as Dirección General de Televisión Educativa, is the producer of educational programs of the Secretariat of Public Education of Mexico with origins dating back to 1968. Which are broadcast on the Edusat, an educational television network. Edusat is an portmanteau of "education" and "satellite".

History
The government of Mexico implemented Telesecundaria in 1968 to provide secondary education to students in rural areas through broadcast television channels, such as XHGC-TV in Mexico City. With the launching of the Morelos II satellite, Telesecundaria began transmitting on one of its analog channels in 1988. In 1994, Telesecundaria began broadcasting in a digital format with the advent of the Solidaridad I satellite, and Edusat was born and began transmitting on six channels. The signal was moved to Solidaridad II in 2000.

In 2008 Edusat services migrated to Satmex 5, by this time with signal power five times what it was during the Morelos II era and the number of channels increased to 10 with capacity for six more and a larger area of coverage. Today, Televisión Educativa resources are received by more than 36,000 set-top boxes located in Mexico and 1,000 in other areas of the continent. The technological component is managed by the Secretaría de Comunicaciones y Transportes (SCT) and Telecomunicaciones de México (Telecomm).

Although the signal is available in all of the Americas (except for the eastern part of Brazil) Edusat services are only offered in Mexico, Central America and certain regions of the United States.

In early August 2020, the COVID-19 pandemic led to the Mexican government signing contracts with commercial TV broadcasters Televisa, TV Azteca, Grupo Imagen, and Grupo Multimedios, the public TV broadcasters and 36 radio stations to air school student targeted programming over their networks. Each of the four commercial TV broadcasters will launch a new subchannel on their digital broadcasting multiplexes.  Production and content for these programs was made by both the Ministry of Public Education (SEP) and Canal Once. From 8am to 7pm every weekday from August 24, more than 4,550 television programs and 640 radio programs will be broadcast in 20 languages at primary and high school level.

Edusat
Edusat transmits 13 television services, seven of which it programs, in addition to three public radio stations:

Edusat-programmed
11 Telesecundaria (for secondary students)
12  (to teach teachers, was previously called "TV Docencia")
17  (for senior secondary students)
24  (for secondary students and adults)
26 Especiales (special events channel)
27 Telesecundaria+ (for secondary students)
30  (for learners of all ages)

Ingenio Tv is also available outside of the Edusat system on some terrestrial SPR multiplexes. Additionally, various educational television stations in Mexico, particularly university-run stations such as TV UNAM and XHMNU-TDT in Monterrey, also air a selection of programming from Televisión Educativa.

 (a channel for Mexican citizens living in the United States) was on 21.  (for university students) was on 22. Red de las Artes (an arts and culture channel) was on channel 23.

ILCE
 (Latin American Educational Communication Institute) operates two Edusat channels:

15 Summa Saberes (educational channel for students)
18 Canal Internationale (Ibero-American science and culture channel, was previously called "Canal Iberoamerica")

ILCE once also operated "Innova Conocimiento" on 13 and "Edusat Space" on 16.

Other educational television services
21 Discovery Kids
23 Canal 22
25 Canal del Congreso
28 tv•unam

Canal Cl@se was on 22. UNAD's TV service was also carried.

Radio
12 Radio Educación
15 Instituto Mexicano de la Radio
28 Radio UNAM

See also
 Education in Mexico

References

External links
  
 Learning through TV and Internet in Mexico at the United Nations Educational, Scientific and Cultural Organization

Television channels and stations established in 1994
1994 in Mexico
Education in Mexico
Governmental educational technology organizations
Television networks in Mexico
Science and technology in Mexico
Public television in Mexico